Karol Mondek (born 2 June 1991) is a Slovak professional footballer who currently plays for ViOn Zlaté Moravce.

Career statistics

External links

References

1991 births
Living people
Slovak expatriate footballers
Slovak footballers
Association football midfielders
Slovak Super Liga players
Eerste Divisie players
I liga players
Czech National Football League players
Czech First League players
AS Trenčín players
AGOVV Apeldoorn players
FC Baník Ostrava players
Raków Częstochowa players
SFC Opava players
FC ViOn Zlaté Moravce players
Expatriate footballers in the Netherlands
Expatriate footballers in the Czech Republic
Expatriate footballers in Poland
Slovak expatriate sportspeople in the Netherlands
Slovak expatriate sportspeople in the Czech Republic
Slovak expatriate sportspeople in Poland
Sportspeople from Martin, Slovakia